The Power Secretary of Pakistan is the Federal Secretary for the Ministry of Energy (Power Division). The position holder is a BPS-22 grade officer, usually belonging to the Pakistan Administrative Service.

See also
Government of Pakistan
Federal Secretary
Interior Secretary of Pakistan
Cabinet Secretary of Pakistan
Finance Secretary of Pakistan
Petroleum Secretary of Pakistan

References

Ministry of Energy (Pakistan)